Pilularia minuta, is a species of fern belonging to the family Marsileaceae.

References

Salviniales
Plants described in 1848
Ferns of Europe